Damian Wleklak (born 28 February 1976) is a former Polish handball player.

Career
He was a member of the Polish national team which received a silver medal at the World Championship in 2007 and a bronze in 2009.

State awards
 Golden Cross of Merit in 2007.

References

External links 
 

1976 births
Living people
Polish male handball players
Polish handball coaches
Handball coaches of international teams
Wisła Płock (handball) players
People from Malbork
Sportspeople from Pomeranian Voivodeship